"Come Back Silly Girl" is a song written by Barry Mann.
It was first released as a single by Steve Lawrence in 1960. This version garnered very little notice, but was a minor hit in Australia.

The Lettermen version 
In 1962, The Lettermen released their version as a single from their album A Song for Young Love. This version achieved greater success than Lawrence's. It became a top twenty hit on Billboard's pop and easy listening charts.

References

The Lettermen songs
1962 singles
Songs written by Barry Mann
1960 songs
Capitol Records singles